Tamás Balogh (born 6 September 1967) is a retired Hungarian football goalkeeper.

References

1967 births
Living people
Hungarian footballers
Ferencvárosi TC footballers
MTK Budapest FC players
Pécsi MFC players
Győri ETO FC players
Dunaújváros FC players
FC Tatabánya players
Szombathelyi Haladás footballers
Association football goalkeepers
Hungary international footballers
Hungarian football managers
Ferencvárosi TC non-playing staff
Footballers from Budapest
20th-century Hungarian people